Andreen is a surname. Notable people with the surname include:

Andrea Andreen (1888–1972), Swedish physician, pacifist, and feminist
Omar Andréen (1922–2010), Norwegian painter, graphic artist, and illustrator
Scilla Andreen (born 1961), American filmmaker